Bryan Charles Fogarty (June 11, 1969 – March 6, 2002) was a Canadian ice hockey defenceman who played for the Quebec Nordiques, Pittsburgh Penguins and Montreal Canadiens. A great star in the junior leagues and a high draft choice in the National Hockey League (NHL), his career was marred by persistent alcohol and drug use, which prevented him from playing a full season at any point and led to him being frequently traded.

Playing career
As a youth, Fogarty played in the 1982 Quebec International Pee-Wee Hockey Tournament with a minor ice hockey team from Brantford.

Fogarty was an Ontario Hockey League (OHL) superstar in the late 1980s. He was chosen first overall in the 1985 OHL draft by Ken Slater of the Kingston Canadians, ahead of future NHLers Adam Graves (sixth), Bryan Marchment (12th), Brendan Shanahan (13th), and Jody Hull (14th). Scouts heaped praise upon Fogarty for his hockey sense and puck control. Combined with his 6'2" 205 pound frame, Fogarty's skills made him one of the best junior players in Canadian hockey history.

After breaking Bobby Orr's 23-year-old record for goals (38) by a defenceman in a season and Cam Plante's Canadian junior record for points (140) in a season by a defenceman with 155 in 60 games with the Niagara Falls Thunder, he was named Canadian Major Junior Hockey Player of the Year in 1989. Both records still stand, as does his single game record for most assists by a defenceman (8), which he accomplished twice in the same season (1988–89).

Fogarty was drafted ninth overall by the Quebec Nordiques in 1987, six spots before Joe Sakic. He lasted parts of three seasons in Quebec, then he was traded to the Pittsburgh Penguins. He signed with the Tampa Bay Lightning as a free agent, and later the Montreal Canadiens, Buffalo Sabres and Chicago Blackhawks, without actually playing for Tampa, Buffalo or Chicago.

Fogarty also spent a fair amount of time in the minors, playing in Halifax, New Haven, Muskegon, Cleveland, Atlanta, Las Vegas, Kansas City, Minnesota and Detroit. He also played in Europe; in Davos, Milan and Hanover. In 1999 Fogarty attempted a much-publicized comeback with the Toronto Maple Leafs' affiliate, the St. John's Maple Leafs. He lasted 3 regular season games with them before being released. In all he played nine seasons of pro hockey in seven leagues for 17 teams, retiring in 2001.

Fogarty maintains the distinction of recording the last natural hat trick in Quebec Nordiques franchise history when he scored three straight goals on December 1, 1990 in a 4-2 home win over the Sabres. He was the first Nordiques defenseman to record a hat trick.

Personal life

Born in Montreal to parents Tom and Virginia, Fogarty was youngest of five. He had two sisters, Lynn and Lori, as well as two brothers, Glen and Patrick. Lori died of cancer at 38.

Fogarty grew up in Brantford, Ontario, the same city in which Wayne Gretzky had grown up. Fogarty's talent was apparent right away. Brantford Minor Hockey Association coordinator Bob Coyne told reporters that "he was a star. From the time he put skates on, he was better than everyone else. "We had seen Wayne (Gretzky). Wayne had to work at it. His game was outsmarting everybody else. Fogarty's game was outperforming everybody else. That's like comparing a Volkswagen to a Corvette."

Growing up, Fogarty listened to Ozzy Osbourne and Black Sabbath, sported a mullet and loved to hang out with his friends. He started drinking at an early age. When Fogarty was 15 he was already playing with players who were much older than him due to his exceptional skill level, and would frequent bars and strip clubs with the older players. During his junior hockey days in the OHL he would take Niagara Falls Thunder coach Bill Laforge aside in the locker room and ask him in a whisper if his teammates hated him. During his time with the Kingston Canadians he was known as "Tippy" because, according to teammate Marc Laforge, "he was always tipsy".

During his NHL days, he sought help on numerous occasions. The Nordiques knew about his drinking problem and sent him to an alcohol rehab clinic in Minnesota, provided a psychologist, and housed him with a family in Quebec City. They roomed him with another hockey player who was looking to straighten out his life: John Kordic. Fogarty and Kordic met in a rehab center and became friends immediately. In the fall and winter of 1991, Fogarty stayed clean with the help of Kordic. However, in January 1992, Kordic began using drugs again and died of a heart attack in August of that year. Quebec wound up trading away Fogarty to Pittsburgh Penguins. Pierre Pagé, the Nordiques general manager at the time, promised Fogarty he would trade him if he could stay sober for three months. He lasted 12 games with the Penguins, who were unhappy with Fogarty's lack of conditioning.

This scenario repeated itself many times over the next five years, with the Montreal Canadiens and non-NHL clubs. In 1999 Fogarty was arrested and charged with drug possession after a break-in at a school in Brantford. Fogarty was charged with break and enter, and possession of a controlled substance. According to the police report, Fogarty broke open the kitchen doors at the Tollgate Technological Skills Centre and was found standing naked in the kitchen with cooking oil spilled on the floor around him. He was granted a conditional discharge, placed on probation for one year, and was ordered to donate $500 to a local addiction service after he pleaded guilty to one count of mischief. After retiring in 2001, Fogarty remained clean and sober for more than a year. He returned to Brantford to take over the family business, Fogarty's Mobile Canteen.

Death

Fogarty died in Myrtle Beach, South Carolina on March 6, 2002. Fogarty and his wife Jennifer's uncle, Thomas Branch, were staying at a motel called the Compass Cove, to do some deep sea fishing. He and Branch arrived on the morning of March 5. After checking in, they went right to the bar, where they spent most of the day drinking. The next morning, Branch was unable to wake Fogarty, and called EMS. Fogarty was transported to the Grand Strand Regional Center where he was pronounced dead shortly after. The coroner reported that Fogarty died of an enlarged heart. He is interred at Holy Cross Cemetery in Brantford.

Career statistics

Awards
OHL First All-Star Team (1987, 1989)
Red Tilson Trophy (OHL MVP) (1989)
CHL Defenceman of the Year (1989)
CHL Player of the Year (1989)
U.A.P./N.A.P.A. AUTOPRO Plus-Minus Award (1989)

Records
Last natural hat trick by a Nordiques defenseman (Dec 1/90 against Buffalo Sabres, 4-2 win)
Most points in a season by a defenceman (CHL) - 155 (47G, 108A), 1988–89
Most goals in a season by a defenceman (OHL) - 47, 1988–89
Most assists in a season by a defenceman (OHL) - 108, 1988–89
Most points in a game by a defenceman (OHL) - 8 (3 goals, 5 assists) - Nov. 11 1988 - vs. Sudbury Wolves

In popular culture
Dave Bidini's song "The Land is Wild", released as the title track of the Bidiniband's debut release in June 2009, tells the life story of Fogarty.

References

https://neilacharya.substack.com/p/bryans-song?s=w

External links

1969 births
2002 deaths
Atlanta Knights players
Baton Rouge Kingfish players
Brantford Alexanders players
Canadian ice hockey defencemen
Cleveland Lumberjacks players
Detroit Vipers players
Elmira Jackals (UHL) players
Halifax Citadels players
Hannover Scorpions players
HC Davos players
HC Milano players
Huntsville Tornado players
Ice hockey people from Ontario
Ice hockey people from Montreal
Indianapolis Ice players
Kansas City Blades players
Kingston Canadians players
Knoxville Speed players
Las Vegas Thunder players
Minnesota Moose players
Montreal Canadiens players
Muskegon Lumberjacks players
National Hockey League first-round draft picks
New Haven Nighthawks players
Niagara Falls Thunder players
Pittsburgh Penguins players
Quebec Nordiques draft picks
Quebec Nordiques players
St. John's Maple Leafs players
Sportspeople from Brantford
Canadian expatriate ice hockey players in Germany
Canadian expatriate ice hockey players in Switzerland
Canadian expatriate ice hockey players in the United States